Luis Alberto Pavez Muñoz (born 17 September 1995) is a Chilean professional footballer who last played for Liga MX club Juárez as a left back.

Honours

Club
Colo-Colo
 Primera División: 2014–C

Santiago Wanderers
 Copa Chile: 2017

References

External links

1995 births
Living people
People from Santiago
People from Santiago Province, Chile
People from Santiago Metropolitan Region
Chilean footballers
Chile under-20 international footballers
Chile youth international footballers
Chilean expatriate footballers
Association football defenders
Segunda División Profesional de Chile players
Chilean Primera División players
Segunda División B players
Liga MX players
Colo-Colo B footballers
Colo-Colo footballers
Cádiz CF players
Santiago Wanderers footballers
Unión Española footballers
FC Juárez footballers
Chilean expatriate sportspeople in Spain
Expatriate footballers in Spain
Chilean expatriate sportspeople in Mexico
Chilean expatriates in Mexico
Expatriate footballers in Mexico
2015 South American Youth Football Championship players
Footballers from Santiago